John Creighton (August 19, 1817 – January 31, 1885) was an Irish-born publisher, politician and prison official in Ontario, Canada. He served as mayor of Kingston from 1863 to 1865. Creighton was warden of Kingston Penitentiary from 1871 to 1885.

The son of Hugh Creighton and Mary Young, he was born near Clandeboye, County Down and came to Kingston with his family in 1823. Creighton was educated at the Midland District Grammar School. He worked as an apprentice printer in Montreal, then returned to Kingston to work for the Kingston Chronicle & Gazette. He became president of the Kingston Typographical Society in 1844. In 1846, he moved to the Kingston Argus; he also contributed articles to the paper. He became a clerk in a book and stationery store in 1851, later buying the store. Creighton later added printing and bookbinding services. In 1866, he was named police magistrate and, in 1870, acting warden for the Kingston Penitentiary. He was appointed warden the following year. As warden, he was held in high regard by both the inmates and his superiors.

In 1850, he married Frances, the sister of architect William Coverdale.

During his tenure as warden, Cedarhedge, the official warden's residence was constructed.

From 1859 to 1862, he represented Victoria ward on Kingston city council. Creighton was elected mayor in 1863 and reelected by acclamation in 1864 and 1865.

He suffered two heart attacks, the second in 1884. He died the following year in Portsmouth at the age of 67.

References 

1817 births
1885 deaths
Mayors of Kingston, Ontario